Artur Alvim is a district in the subprefecture of Penha in the city of São Paulo, placed in the eastern suburban area of the city. It constitutes in a medium-low income neighbourhood, with a mixed space occupied by residences and local commerce. It is served by the Artur Alvim station of the São Paulo metro.

Districts of São Paulo